The Embassy of the State of Palestine in Tunisia is the diplomatic mission of the Palestine in Tunisia. It is located in Hakim Conseil Street in Tunis.

See also

List of diplomatic missions in Tunisia.
List of diplomatic missions of Palestine.

References

Diplomatic missions of the State of Palestine
Diplomatic missions in Tunisia
State of Palestine–Tunisia relations